Ryuk may refer to:
Ryuk (Death Note), a character in the Death Note media franchise
Ryuk (ransomware)
Ryuk (village) or Rük, a village in the Quba Rayon of Azerbaijan
Ryuk, a romanization for 6 in Korean numerals
Ryuk, a North Korean romanization for the Yook surname